Jane Roberts (1929–1984) was an American author, poet and spirit medium

Jane Roberts may also refer to:

 Jane Roberts (died 1684), alias for the highwayrobber Jane Voss
 Jane Roberts (author) (1792 – after 1861), English author
 Jane Roberts (first lady) ( 1819–1914), First Lady of Liberia
 Jane Roberts (politician) (born 1955), British psychiatrist and Labour Party politician
Jane Roberts (literary scholar), Northern Irish literary scholar
 Jane, Lady Roberts (1949–2021), Royal Librarian
 Jane Sullivan Roberts, wife of John Roberts